Moyen is a village and commune in the Meurthe-et-Moselle département of north-eastern France.

Geography
The river Mortagne forms most of the commune's south-western border.

See also
Communes of the Meurthe-et-Moselle department

References

External links

 Qui qu'en grogne le château de Moyen

Communes of Meurthe-et-Moselle
Three Bishoprics